Schools in Kalibo, Aklan, Philippines as of January 12, 2013. (The list may not be complete)

Kalibo
Schools
Schools in Aklan